Wislicenus is a surname. Notable people with the surname include:

Gustav Adolf Wislicenus (1803–1875), German theologian
Hermann Wislicenus (1825–1899), German historical painter
Johannes Wislicenus (1835–1902), German chemist
Walter Wislicenus (1859–1905), German astronomer

See also
4588 Wislicenus, a main-belt asteroid
Wislicenus (crater), an impact crater in the Sinus Sabaeus quadrangle of Mars